The Athalie Richardson Irvine Clarke Prize, or “Clarke Prize”, is awarded annually by the National Water Research Institute (NWRI) of Fountain Valley, California. It consists of a medallion and $50,000 award for demonstrated excellence in the fields of water science and technology. It recognizes the highest contributions by an individual engaged in the discovery, development, improvement, or understanding of the issues associated with water quality, quantity, technology, or public policy.

Nominations and selection
The Clarke Prize was established by NWRI in 1993 in honor of the late Athalie Richardson Irvine Clarke, co-founder of NWRI.  The Prize was established in collaboration with Joan Irvine Smith, co-founder of NWRI and the daughter of Mrs. Clarke.
 
Clarke Prize Laureates are active researchers and/or practitioners who demonstrate excellence through their continuous contributions to the body of knowledge related to protecting, maintaining, treating, and reclaiming water resources.  The Clarke Prize is one of only a dozen water prizes awarded worldwide and has been distinguished by the International Congress of Distinguished Awards as one of the most prestigious awards in the world.

Nominations for the Clarke Prize, as well as related credentials and letters of recommendation, must be received by April 1 of each year. The Clarke Prize recipient is selected by the Clarke Prize Executive Committee.

Lecture and award ceremony
The Clarke Prize is awarded annually at the Clarke Prize Lecture and Award Ceremony.  The black tie dinner includes a presentation of the medallion and the award of the $50,000 prize by members of the Joan Irvine Smith and Athalie R. Clarke Foundation.  As part of the award ceremony, the recipient presents the annual Clarke Prize Lecture, which gives the recipient an opportunity to promote his or her area of expertise and to educate the audience on its importance and impact in the field of water research and technology.

List of Clarke Prize laureates

National Water Research Institute
The National Water Research Institute (NWRI), a 501c3 nonprofit, was founded by a group of Southern California water agencies in collaboration with the Joan Irvine Smith and Athalie R. Clarke Foundation. Since 1991, NWRI has served as an independent industry expert in water science, technology, and public policy.  NWRI's many leading-edge projects and activities have advanced the worldwide understanding in areas such as treatment technologies, potable reuse, salinity and nutrient management, and other factors that influence the quality and availability of water supplies and resources.

Major activities include:

 Funding and guiding scientific research projects.
 Supporting graduate fellowships and other water-related educational programs.
 Developing outreach material, such as reports and videos.
 Holding events like workshops and conferences to promote new issues and technologies.
 Providing peer-review panel services for local and state water agencies.
 Managing projects or programs for water agencies and others.

Athalie Richardson Irvine Clarke
"Nothing is more important than the careful stewardship and development of our water resources", said Athalie Richardson Irvine Clarke, co-founder of NWRI.

Clarke (1903 - 1993) married James Irvine, Jr., in 1929, and along with her daughter, Joan Irvine Smith, ran the Irvine Ranch, one of California's most diverse and productive farms. Both Clarke and her daughter encouraged The Irvine Company to adopt a master plan for what would become the city of Irvine. She also encouraged The Irvine Company and the University of California system to establish the University of California, Irvine, on a portion of the vast Irvine Ranch. She and her daughter also founded the Irvine Museum, which is dedicated to California Impressionism. Clarke knew several of the "plein-air" painters of her generation personally, and the museum's exhibits reflect the California landscape she cherished.

Clarke recognized the vital importance of water and strongly promoted better water science and technology. In 1991, Clarke co-founded NWRI along with her daughter Joan Irvine Smith. In honor of Clarke's vision, NWRI established the Clarke Prize in 1993 to recognize outstanding individuals who have implemented better water science research and technology.

Joan Irvine Smith

 
Smith's reverence for California's native plants and animals inspired her to become a leading environmental activist, speaking out about the urgent need to protect the state's precious natural resources and to balance environmental preservation with economic growth. She was also responsible for donating land to what became the University of California at Irvine.
 
As a leading philanthropist through the Joan Irvine Smith and Athalie R. Clarke Foundation, Smith continued to champion the University of California at Irvine, funding important medical causes, including the Reeve-Irvine Research Center. She also supports NWRI, which was founded by her vision and financial support, as well as numerous other environmental, cultural, and historical endeavors. She died on 19 December 2019.

See also

 List of environmental awards

External links
The National Water Research Institute of Fountain Valley, California
Clarke Prize Official Website

References 

Clarke Prize